Richard McNeil Henderson,  (14 January 1886 - 16 March 1972) was a British engineer and colonial administrator. He was the Director of Public Works (Hong Kong) from 1932 to 1939.

Henderson was a member of the Institution of Civil Engineers and Institution of Mechanical Engineers. During his service as Director of Public Works, he was responsible for the construction of South Kowloon Magistracy in 1933, Wan Chai Market in 1937 and Central Market in 1938. He was appointed a CBE in 1939. He was an ex officio member of the Legislative Council of Hong Kong.

Henderson Road at Jardine's Lookout, Hong Kong Island, is named after him.

References

Members of the Executive Council of Hong Kong
Members of the Legislative Council of Hong Kong
Government officials of Hong Kong
Hong Kong civil servants
Hong Kong civil engineers
British civil engineers
British mechanical engineers
Commanders of the Order of the British Empire
1886 births
1972 deaths
British people in British Hong Kong